120 Tage - The Fine Art of Beauty and Violence is an electro-industrial studio collaboration between German musicians Mona Mur and En Esch (of KMFDM, Pigface, and Slick Idiot). It was released on February 15, 2009, on Pale Music International. The English translation of the album's title is 120 Days.

Release 

120 Tage was released on February 15, 2009, through Pale Music's web site, and later digitally through KMFDM's web store with two additional bonus tracks.

Track listing

External links 

 120 Tage - The Fine Art of Beauty and Violence at Discogs
 Mona Mur and En Esch on MySpace
 120 Tage - The Fine Art of Beauty and Violence at Pale Music International
 120 Tage - The Fine Art of Beauty and Violence at the KMFDM web store

References 

2009 debut albums
German-language albums
Collaborative albums
En Esch albums
Mona Mur albums